Portici is a town and comune of the Metropolitan City of Naples in Italy. It is the site of the Portici Royal Palace.

Geography
There is a small port. To the south east is Ercolano, formerly Resina, which occupies the site of ancient Herculaneum. San Giorgio a Cremano is another town nearby.

History

The city was completely destroyed by the Eruption of Vesuvius in 1631, but was rebuilt. Charles III of Spain, King of Naples and Sicily, built a royal palace in the town between 1738 and 1748. After Garibaldi defeated the Bourbons in 1860, the palace was turned into the Portici botanic gardens and the Royal Higher School of Agriculture.  It once contained the antiquities from Herculaneum, which have since been moved to Naples.

Economy
The inhabitants were historically engaged in fishing, silk-growing and silk-weaving up to the beginning of the 20th century. Later a more diversified economy emerged, with industry and trade as main pillars.

Vincenzo Cuomo is the mayor.  In 2009, he banned shops from displaying Christmas decorations because shopkeepers were subject to extortion to buy Camorra (mob) sold decorations.

In March 2008, Boeing opened a research centre for advanced materials under an agreement with the Italian aerospace company Alenia.

Notable people
Charles IV of Spain (1748–1819), King of Spain
 Wolfgang Amadeus Mozart, who played in the royal chapel for the Borbone family

Notes and references

External links

 Local information portal

 
Coastal towns in Campania